Liquid air is air that has been cooled to very low temperatures (cryogenic temperatures), so that it has condensed into a pale blue  mobile liquid. To thermally insulate it from room temperature, it is stored in specialized containers (vacuum insulated flasks are often used). Liquid air can absorb heat rapidly and revert to its gaseous state. It is often used for condensing other substances into liquid and/or solidifying them, and as an industrial source of nitrogen, oxygen, argon, and other inert gases through a process called air separation.

Properties 
The density of a given air sample varies depending on the composition of that sample (e.g. humidity &  concentration). Since dry gaseous air contains approximately 78% nitrogen, 21% oxygen, and 1% argon, the density of liquid air at standard composition is calculated by the percentage of the components and their respective liquid densities (see liquid nitrogen and liquid oxygen).

However, it can be difficult to keep at a stable temperature as the liquid boils, since the nitrogen will boil off first, leaving the mixture oxygen-rich and changing the boiling point. This may also occur in some circumstances due to the liquid air condensing oxygen out of the atmosphere.

Preparation

Principle of production 
The constituents of air were once known as "permanent gases", as they could not be liquified solely by compression at room temperature. A compression process will raise the temperature of the gas. This heat is removed by cooling to the ambient temperature in a heat exchanger, and then expanding by venting into a chamber. The expansion causes a lowering of the temperature, and by counter-flow heat exchange of the expanded air, the pressurized air entering the expander is further cooled. With sufficient compression, flow, and heat removal, eventually droplets of liquid air will form, which may then be employed directly for low temperature demonstrations.

The main constituents of air were liquefied for the first time by Polish scientists Karol Olszewski and Zygmunt Wróblewski in 1883.

Devices for the production of liquid air are simple enough to be fabricated by the experimenter using commonly available materials.

Process of manufacturing 
The most common process for the preparation of liquid air is the two-column Hampson–Linde cycle using the Joule–Thomson effect. Air is fed at high pressure (>) into the lower column, in which it is separated into pure nitrogen and oxygen-rich liquid. The rich liquid and some of the nitrogen are fed as reflux into the upper column, which operates at low pressure (<), where the final separation into pure nitrogen and oxygen occurs. A raw argon product can be removed from the middle of the upper column for further purification.

Air can also be liquefied by Claude's process, which combines cooling by Joule–Thomson effect, isentropic expansion and regenerative cooling.

Application 
In manufacturing processes, the liquid air product is typically fractionated into its constituent gases in either liquid or gaseous form, as the oxygen is especially useful for fuel gas welding and cutting and for medical use, and the argon is useful as an oxygen-excluding shielding gas in gas tungsten arc welding.

Transport and energy storage 

Between 1899 and 1902, the automobile Liquid Air was produced and demonstrated by a joint American/English company, with the claim that they could construct a car that would run a hundred miles on liquid air.

On 2 October 2012, the Institution of Mechanical Engineers said liquid air could be used as a means of storing energy. This was based on a technology that was developed by Peter Dearman, a garage inventor in Hertfordshire, England to power vehicles.

See also 
 Liquid nitrogen
 Liquid oxygen
 Cryogenic energy storage
 Industrial gas
 Liquefaction of gases
 Liquid nitrogen vehicle

References

External links 
 2013-05-20 MIT Technology Review article on liquid air developments for transportation and grid energy storage

Atmosphere
Coolants
Cryogenics
Energy storage
Energy technology
Engineering thermodynamics
Industrial gases
Industrial processes
Phases of matter